Ijebu Igbo (Yoruba: Ìjẹ̀bú-Igbó) is a town in Ogun State, Nigeria. It is approximately a 15-minute drive north of Ijebu Ode.

Ijebu Igbo, also written as Ijebu-Igbo, is the headquarters of Ijebu North Local Government Authority of Ogun State, Nigeria.

The town's primary economic activities are timber, cocoa, and exploitation of mineral resources and it is home to many saw mills and also a developed quarry.

Like all other Ijebus, the people of Ijebu Igbo speak the Ijebu dialect, which is distinct from but similar to the Yoruba language.

History 
It is said that the founder, Onayelu, was a great hunter who hunted the northern parts of Odo-Oluiwa; the present Ijebu Ode, where he was a prince. Following the sudden demise of his father and the subsequent controversial accession to the throne of his younger brother, the Ofiranoye while Onayelu was away hunting, he decided to migrate from Ijebu Ode to settle permanently on the large expanse of land where he had been hunting and known today as Ijebu Igbo. Ijebu Igbo forest reserve which is called the Omo forest reserve is among the 12 biggest forest reserves in Nigeria among which are:

 Ijebu igbo forest reserve
 Queen Elizabeth forest reserve
 J1 forest reserve
 J2 forest reserve
 J3 forest reserve
 J4 forest reserve 
 Apoje forest reserve and many more.

Classification 
Ijebu Igbo is divided into five clans; Oke-Sopin, Oke-Agbo, Ojowo, Atikori, and Japara.

An Oba (king) is enthroned to govern each of these clans. These Obas are classified as "second-class" and they all submit to the headship of the Orimolusi of Ijebu-Igbo. The Orimolusi is a first-class and he is the supreme head of Ijebu-Igbo.

Traditional Rulers in Ijebu-Igbo and its Environment 

 The Orimolusi of Ijebu-Igbo
 The Ebumawe of Ago-Iwoye
 The Limeri of Awa
 The Alaporu of Ilaporu
 The Oloru of Oru-Ijebu
 The Sopenlukale of Oke Sopin
 The Bejeroku of Oke-Agbo
 The Olokine of Ojowo
 The Keegbo of Atikori
 The Abija Parako of Japara
 The Lowa of Asigidi .

Government 
Orimolusi is the traditional ruler of ijebu Igbo land and presides over four local government areas and 10 Local Community Development Area (LCDA) in Ogun state Nigeria, which is the largest kingdom in Ogun state in term of land mass with more than 300 villages.

Local Government Areas 
Ijebu North local government

iIebu North East local government

Ijebu East local government

Ogun Waterside local government

Local Community Development Areas 
The local governments and LCDA are all under the authority of the Orimolusi of Ijebu Igbo( Oloja Igbo).

The last Orimolusi of Ijebu-Igbo was late Oba Samuel Adetayo Onasanya (Ikupakude IV), who died in 1994.

Ijebu East Ogbere

Ijebu East Central Ojowo

Ijebu North Ijebu Igbo

Ijebu North Central Oru

Ijebu Igbo West Ojowo

Ago Iwoye Ibipe

Ijebu North East Atan

Yemoji Ilese

Geography 
Ijebu Igbo is the second largest town in Ogun State and the largest among Ijebus in terms of land mass, there are arable land for farming.

Also there are hundreds of villages and hamlet under Ijebu Igbo. The town is bordered by Ibadan, Ikire, and Ondo.

High Schools & Colleges 
Ijebu Igbo boasts of many secondary schools, amongst which are two of the foremost secondary schools in Nigeria, Molusi College & Abusi Edumare Academy founded on January 28, 1949 and in January 1971 respectively.

Ijebu Igbo is also home to some higher institutions, such as; Abraham Adesanya Polytechnic (AAPOLY) Which is owned by Ogun State government, established 2004  and Nigeria Prison Service Academy a first of its kind institution in sub-Saharan Africa

Notable People from Ijebu Igbo 
Ijebu Igbo is the political headquarter as well as the commercial nerve centre of Ijebu North local government with many of its indigenes playing actively on the national political stage. Ijebu igbo has also produced prominent politicians and business men in the history of Nigeria like Mike Adenuga, Abraham Adesanya, Akinwumi Adesina, President of the AfDB,Olanrewaju Kassim (shokas), Olabiyi Durojaiye, world renowned Prof of medicine, Oshotimehin, Buruji Kashamu, Hon. Bankole, Olalekan Mustapha, Abraham Adesanya, Sefiu Adegbenga Kaka and Oluwatosin Oluyemi. and more

References

Populated places in Ogun State
Towns in Yorubaland